Ezra Frank Sperry (June 18, 1843 - August 13, 1916) was the twenty-first mayor of Orlando from 1913 to 1916.

Biography
E. Frank Sperry was born in Bethany, Connecticut, on June 18, 1843. He was educated at Eastman Business College. He worked as a grocery clerk before starting his own company, Sperry Manufacturing. He married Mary W. Pratt on October 13, 1869.

He moved to Orlando in 1882 and organized the South Florida Foundry and Machine Works.

He was elected mayor of Orlando in 1913. He died in office from Bright's disease on August 13, 1916, at the age of 73.

References

Mayors of Orlando, Florida
1843 births
1916 deaths
20th-century American politicians
Eastman Business College alumni
People from Bethany, Connecticut